The 2022 Safari Rally (also known as the Safari Rally Kenya 2022) was a motor racing event for rally cars held over four days between 23 and 26 June 2022. It would mark the sixty-ninth running of the Safari Rally. The event was the sixth round of the 2022 World Rally Championship, World Rally Championship-2 and World Rally Championship-3.

Sébastien Ogier and Julien Ingrassia are the defending rally winners. However, Ingrassia would not defend his title as he retired from the sport at the end of 2021 season. Onkar Rai and Drew Sturrock are the defending rally winners in the WRC-3 category.

Kalle Rovanperä and Jonne Halttunen won the event. Their team, Toyota Gazoo Racing WRT, successfully defended their title. Kajetan Kajetanowicz and Maciej Szczepaniak won the World Rally Championship-2 category. Maxine Wahome and Murage Waigwa won the World Rally Championship-3 category as well as the junior class.

Background

Entry list
The following crews entered into the rally. The event was opened to crews competing in the World Rally Championship, its support categories, the World Rally Championship-2 and World Rally Championship-3, and privateer entries that are not registered to score points in any championship. Twelve were entered under Rally1 regulations, as are ten Rally2 crews in the World Rally Championship-2 and five Rally3 crews in the World Rally Championship-3.

Itinerary
All dates and times are EAT (UTC+3).

Report

WRC Rally1

Classification

Special stages

Championship standings

WRC Rally2

Classification

Special stages
<div class="overflowbugx" style="overflow:auto;">

Championship standings

WRC Rally3

Classification

Special stages

Championship standings

References

External links
   
 2022 Safari Rally at eWRC-results.com
 2022 Safari Rally at rally-maps.com 

2022 in Kenyan sport
Safari
June 2022 sports events in Africa
2022